SS Rainbow may refer to one of several Type C2 ships built for the United States Maritime Commission:

  (MC hull number 124, Type C2-T), built by Tampa Shipbuilding; transferred to the United States Navy as  USS Rainier (AE-5); scrapped in 1971
  (MC hull number 1168, Type C2-S-B1), built by Moore Dry Dock; sold for commercial use under the name Virginia Lykes in 1947; scrapped in 1973